Yury Viktaravich Dauhapolau (born 20 June 1970 in Voskresenovka, Lipetsk) is a Belarusian sport shooter who competes in the men's 10 metre air pistol. At the 2012 Summer Olympics, he finished 30th in the qualifying round, failing to make the cut for the final.

References

External links
 
 

1970 births
Living people
Belarusian male sport shooters
Olympic shooters of Belarus
Shooters at the 2008 Summer Olympics
Shooters at the 2012 Summer Olympics